October 26 - Eastern Orthodox liturgical calendar - October 28

All fixed commemorations below celebrated on November 9 by Eastern Orthodox Churches on the Old Calendar.

For October 27th, Orthodox Churches on the Old Calendar commemorate the Saints listed on October 14.

Saints
 Saint Claudia Procula, wife of Pontius Pilate (1st century)
 Martyrs Capitolina and Eroteis, of Cappadocia (304)
 Martyrs Mark of the island of Thasos and those with him (304)
 Martyr Nestor of Thessaloniki (306)
 Martyrs Mabrianos and Valentine.
 Saint Kyriakos II, Patriarch of Constantinople (606)

Pre-Schism Western saints
 Saint Florentius, a martyr in Trois-Châteaux in Burgundy in France (3rd century)
 Martyrs Vincent, Sabina and Christeta, martyrs in Avila in Spain (303)
 Saint Gaudiosus of Naples, Bishop of Abitina in North Africa (c. 455)
 Saint Namatius (Namace), ninth Bishop of Clermont in France (c. 462)
 Saint Abbán (Eibbán, Moabba), founder of many monasteries, mostly in the south of Ireland (c. 520)
 Saint Oran of Iona (Otteran, Odhran, Odran), monk of Iona Abbey (c. 563)
 Saint Desiderius of Auxerre, Bishop of Auxerre in France (c. 625)
 Saint Colman of Senboth-Fola (Colman Na Fiachrach), a disciple of St Aidan of Ferns, he was Abbot of Senboth-Fola (Seuboth-Folu, Seanboth-Colmain), near Ferns (c. 632)

Post-Schism Orthodox saints
 Venerable Nestor the Chronicler, of the Kiev Caves (1114)
 Venerable Nestor the Unlettered (not the Chronicler), of the Far Kiev Caves (14th century)
 Venerable Demetrius of Basarabov in Bulgaria (13th century, or 1685)  (see also: October 26 )
 Saint Alexander (Okropiridze), Bishop of Guria and Mingrelia, Georgia (1907)

New Martys and Confessors
 New Hieromartyr Sergius (Chernukhin), Abbot, of Danilov Monastery, Moscow (1942)

Other commemorations
 Narrative about the Iberians, involving a certain ascetic woman who healed the sick, including their queen, converting many to Christ (c. 332)
 Uncovering of the relics (1539), in Pereyaslavl-Zalessky, of St. Andrew, Prince of Smolensk (1390)
 Repose of Hieroschemamonk Antiochus of Svir, disciple of Elder Theodore of Svir (1832)

Icon gallery

Notes

References

Sources
 October 27 / November 9. Orthodox Calendar (PRAVOSLAVIE.RU).
 November 9 / October 27. HOLY TRINITY RUSSIAN ORTHODOX CHURCH (A parish of the Patriarchate of Moscow).
 October 27. OCA - The Lives of the Saints.
 The Autonomous Orthodox Metropolia of Western Europe and the Americas (ROCOR). St. Hilarion Calendar of Saints for the year of our Lord 2004. St. Hilarion Press (Austin, TX). p. 80.
 The Twenty-Seventh Day of the Month of October. Orthodoxy in China.
 October 27. Latin Saints of the Orthodox Patriarchate of Rome.
 The Roman Martyrology. Transl. by the Archbishop of Baltimore. Last Edition, According to the Copy Printed at Rome in 1914. Revised Edition, with the Imprimatur of His Eminence Cardinal Gibbons. Baltimore: John Murphy Company, 1916. p. 331.
 Rev. Richard Stanton. A Menology of England and Wales, or, Brief Memorials of the Ancient British and English Saints Arranged According to the Calendar, Together with the Martyrs of the 16th and 17th Centuries. London: Burns & Oates, 1892. p. 516.
Greek Sources
 Great Synaxaristes:  27 ΟΚΤΩΒΡΙΟΥ. ΜΕΓΑΣ ΣΥΝΑΞΑΡΙΣΤΗΣ.
  Συναξαριστής. 27 Οκτωβρίου. ECCLESIA.GR. (H ΕΚΚΛΗΣΙΑ ΤΗΣ ΕΛΛΑΔΟΣ).
  27/10/2017. Ορθόδοξος Συναξαριστής. 
Russian Sources
  9 ноября (27 октября). Православная Энциклопедия под редакцией Патриарха Московского и всея Руси Кирилла (электронная версия). (Orthodox Encyclopedia - Pravenc.ru).
  27 октября по старому стилю / 9 ноября по новому стилю. Русская Православная Церковь - Православный церковный календарь на 2016 год.

October in the Eastern Orthodox calendar